Beacon frame is one of the management frames in IEEE 802.11 based WLANs. It contains all the information about the network. Beacon frames are transmitted periodically, they serve to announce the presence of a wireless LAN and to synchronise the members of the service set. Beacon frames are transmitted by the access point (AP) in an infrastructure basic service set (BSS). In IBSS network beacon generation is distributed among the stations. For the 2.4 GHz spectrum, when having more than 15 SSIDs on non-overlapping channels (or more than 45 in total), beacon frames start to consume significant amount of air time and degrade performance even when most of the networks are idle.

Components 

Beacon frames consist of an 802.11 MAC header, body and FCS. Some of the fields in the body are listed below.

 
 
 
 SSID
 Supported rates
 Frequency-hopping (FH) Parameter Set
 Direct-Sequence (DS) Parameter Set
 Contention-Free (CF) Parameter Set
 IBSS Parameter Set
 Traffic indication map (TIM)

Infrastructure network access points send beacons at a defined interval, which is often set to a default 100 TU which is equivalent to 102.4 ms. In the case of an ad hoc network where there are no access points, a peer station is responsible for sending the beacon. After an ad hoc station receives a beacon frame from a peer, it waits a random amount of time. After that random timeout has elapsed, it will send a beacon frame unless another station has already sent one. In this way, the responsibility of sending beacon frames is rotated amongst all the peers in the ad hoc network, while ensuring that beacons will always be sent.

Most access points allow the changing of the beacon interval. Increasing the beacon interval will cause the beacons to be sent less frequently. This reduces load on the network and increases throughput for clients on the network; however, it has the undesirable effect of delaying association and roaming processes as stations scanning for access points could potentially miss a beacon while scanning other channels. Alternatively, decreasing the beacon interval causes beacons to be sent more frequently. This increases load on the network and decreases throughput for users, but it does result in a quicker association and roaming process. An additional downside of decreasing the beacon interval is that stations in power save mode will consume more power as they must more frequently awake to receive beacons.

Inspecting an idle network with packet-monitoring tools such as tcpdump or Wireshark would show that most traffic on the network consists of beacon frames, with a few non-802-11 packets mixed in, such as DHCP packets. If users joined the network, responses to each beacon would begin to appear, along with regular traffic generated by the users.

Stations must schedule beacon transmission at the nominal beacon interval. However, the transmission may suffer some delays due to the channel access. Like other frames, beacons must follow the CSMA/CA algorithm. This means that if the channel is busy (e.g., another station is currently sending a frame) when the beacon needs to be sent, it must wait. This means that the actual beacon interval may differ from the nominal beacon interval. However, stations are able to compensate for this difference by inspecting the timestamp in the beacon frame when it is finally sent.

Function 

While beacon frames do cause some non-trivial overhead for a network, they are vital for the proper operation of a network. Radio NICs generally scan all RF channels searching for beacons announcing the presence of a nearby access point. When a radio receives a beacon frame, it receives information about the capabilities and configuration of that network, and is also then able to provide a list of available eligible networks, sorted by signal strength. This allows the device to choose to connect to the optimal network.

Even after associating with a network, the radio NIC will continue to scan for beacons. This has several benefits. Firstly, by continuing to scan for other networks, the station has options for alternative networks if the current access point's signal becomes too weak to continue communication. Secondly, as it still receives beacon frames from the currently associated access point, the device is able to use the timestamps in those beacons to update its internal clock. Beacons from the currently associated access point also inform stations of imminent configuration changes, such as data rate changes.

Finally, beacons enable devices to have power saving modes. Access points will hold on to packets destined for stations that are currently sleeping. In the traffic indication map of a beacon frame, the access point is able to inform stations that they have frames waiting for delivery.

References 

IEEE 802.11